Enrique de la Mata (September 20, 1933 – September 6, 1987) was a Spanish parliamentarian, lawyer and minister.  He was the President of the International Federation of Red Cross and Red Crescent Societies from 1981 to 1987.

After the end of the Francoist State with Caudillo Franco's death in 1975 and the Spanish transition to democracy, he was Minister for Trade Union Relations from 5 July 1976 to 4 July 1977 in an interim government, officiating up until the first free elections, and in this role contributed to allowing the trade unions back into Spain.

He joined the Union of the Democratic Centre and was elected to the Spanish Congress of Deputies representing Teruel Province at the 1979 General election but lost his seat in the subsequent election in 1982.

External links
Biography at Red Cross
Biography at Spanish Congress site

Red Cross personnel
Government ministers of Spain
Presidents of the International Federation of Red Cross and Red Crescent Societies
1933 births
1987 deaths
Members of the 1st Congress of Deputies (Spain)
Union of the Democratic Centre (Spain) politicians